Cystidicola is a genus of parasitic nematodes, belonging to the family Cystidicolidae. Species of Cystidicola are parasitic in the swimbladder of fish.

Species
According to the World Register of Marine Species, the genus currently (2018) includes only the following species:

 Cystidicola farionis Fischer, 1798. 

The eggs of Cystidicola farionis are covered with numerous filaments.

Other species have been included in the genus but are now considered to be part of other genera:
 Cystidicola marina Szidat, 1961 
 Cystidicola salmonicola Ishii, 1916
 Cystidicola skrjabini Layman, 1933
 Cystidicola walkeri Ekbaum, 1935

References

Cystidicolidae
Parasites of fish
Secernentea genera
Parasitic nematodes of fish